Oryza eichingeri (syns. Oryza collina and Oryza rhizomatis) is a species of wild rice in the family Poaceae, with a disjunct distribution in Ivory Coast, Republic of the Congo, Democratic Republic of the Congo, Uganda, Kenya, Tanzania, and Sri Lanka. It is being studied as a source of genes for resistance to the brown planthopper (Nilaparvata lugens), an important pest of cultivated rice (Oryza sativa).

References

eichingeri
Flora of Ivory Coast
Flora of the Republic of the Congo
Flora of the Democratic Republic of the Congo
Flora of East Tropical Africa
Flora of Sri Lanka
Plants described in 1930